Sergio Jorge Fafitine (born 10 August 1969) is a Mozambican former breaststroke, butterfly and freestyle swimmer. He competed at the 1988 Summer Olympics and the 1992 Summer Olympics.

References

External links
 

1969 births
Living people
Mozambican male breaststroke swimmers
Mozambican male butterfly swimmers
Mozambican male freestyle swimmers
Olympic swimmers of Mozambique
Swimmers at the 1988 Summer Olympics
Swimmers at the 1992 Summer Olympics
Place of birth missing (living people)